Qarah Aqaj (also Romanized as Qarah Āqāj; also known as Qarah Āqāj-e Moḩammad Nafas, Mohamad Napas, Moḩammad Nafas, and Mumad-Napas) is a village in Jargalan Rural District, Raz and Jargalan District, Bojnord County, North Khorasan Province, Iran. At the 2006 census, its population was 722, in 177 families.

References 

Populated places in Bojnord County